Big Bend (formerly, Bigbend) is an unincorporated community in Butte County, California, United States. It lies at an elevation of 2310 feet (704 m). A post office operated in Big Bend from 1883 to 1891.

References

Unincorporated communities in California
Unincorporated communities in Butte County, California